Stratus Technologies, Inc. is a major producer of fault tolerant computer servers and software. The company was founded in 1980 as Stratus Computer, Inc. in Natick, Massachusetts, and adopted its present name in 1999.  The current CEO and president is Dave Laurello. Stratus Technologies, Inc. is a privately held company, owned solely by Siris Capital Group. The parent company, Stratus Technologies Bermuda Holdings, Ltd., is incorporated in Bermuda.
 
Stratus Computer was a Marlborough, Massachusetts, based producer of fault tolerant minicomputers. It competed with computers from Tandem Computers and to a lesser extent Digital Equipment Corporation's VAX.

Starting in 1983, its computers were resold worldwide by Olivetti under the CPS/32 ("Continuous Processing System") brand. Then, from 1985 to 1993, its computers were resold by IBM under the IBM System/88 brand.  The company is now based in Maynard, Massachusetts.

History
Stratus shipped its first computer in February 1982,  21 months after its founding.  The customer was the West Lynn Creamery, located in nearby Lynn, Massachusetts. 

The company's traditional markets have been financial services companies such as banks and stock exchanges. Beginning in the 1990s, the company moved into the telecommunications industry, particularly in the area of network management and custom services, with the result that its telecommunications revenues surpassed those from enterprise computing. This led to a buyout of the company by Ascend Communications in 1998 (later acquired by Lucent Technologies).

The enterprise server portion of the business was of little interest to Ascend and that portion was spun off in a management buyout in 1999, with funding from international investment firm, Investcorp.  The company was named Stratus Technologies, Inc.

In the second quarter of 2002, Lucent sold the telecom product lines that originally came from Stratus to Platinum Equity, a buyout firm based in Los Angeles.  That unit was eventually named Cemprus LLC.  Stratus purchased Cemprus in 2003.  It is now a wholly owned subsidiary of Stratus.  This acquisition gave Stratus the SS7 signaling software for phone networks and intelligent gateway software so that traditional and IP voice equipment are able to communicate. This software can be used to support higher-level telephony applications such as calling-card and toll free phone number services.

In 2006, Stratus purchased Emergent Network Solutions of Allen, Texas. Stratus sold off Emergent in 2009, and Emergent is now known as Stratus Telecommunications.  The two companies are now separate entities.  One is not the parent of the other. On July 16, 2010, as a reverse merger between YMax and VocalTec -  all of the Stratus Telecommunications technologies are owned by VocalTec.

In 2012, Stratus acquired the assets, products, services, and intellectual property of Marathon Technologies along with its customer base and channel-partner network.

Now privately held, Stratus Technologies, Inc. was acquired by Siris Capital Group on April 28, 2014. On 29 June 2022 Smart Global Holdings announced the acquisition of Stratus from Sirus for US$225 million.

Products and customers
Its legacy product line was originally based on Motorola MC68000 processors (FT and XA series), and then migrated to Intel i860 processors (XA/R series), then to Hewlett-Packard's PA-RISC processors (Continuum series), and finally to Intel Xeon processors (V Series).  That line runs the VOS operating system, which originally had many features inspired by or derived from Multics. Other operating systems supported on the legacy platforms (XA/R, Jetta / Continuum)—HP-UX and a home-grown UNIX product called FTX (Fault-Tolerant UNIX)—are supported but no longer actively sold.

In June 2002, Stratus introduced the ftServer line of Intel-based servers, running Microsoft Windows 2000 and higher. The Stratus ftServer line sold today supports Windows 2000, 2003 and 2008, as well as Red Hat Enterprise Linux. The company sells models of ftServer designated as entry-level, mid-range and enterprise-class fault tolerant servers. The mid-range and enterprise ftServer systems also run VMware vSphere virtualization software.

The company began offering Stratus Avance software in June 2008, a high availability product with virtualization built in. Avance runs on two general-purpose x86 servers and allows deployment of applications across high-availability virtual machines, freeing up existing x86 servers. The two servers comprising the Avance high-availability platform may be separated by up to three miles for purposes of disaster recovery and business continuity. Avance is intended to serve small-to-medium size businesses' need for affordable and simple high availability and virtualization.

Stratus has a large presence in Maynard, Massachusetts, its U.S. headquarters, and in Phoenix, Arizona, as well as several worldwide offices, in locations such as the UK, the Netherlands, South Africa, France, Germany, Italy, Spain, Australia, New Zealand, Singapore, Hong Kong, China and Japan.

The company has a vast customer base, but popular types of its customers include banks and credit unions, emergency response centers (such as 911 in the USA), police departments, fire departments, hospitals, clinics, governments, credit card companies, stock exchanges, telcos/phone companies and Internet providers.

References

External links
Stratus company homepage

Companies based in Maynard, Massachusetts
Computer companies of the United States
Unix variants
Fault-tolerant computer systems
Private equity portfolio companies